José Alejandro Semprún (born March 12, 1973 in La Guayra) is a male long-distance runner from Venezuela. He competed for his native South American country at the 2000 Summer Olympics, finishing in 79th place in the men's marathon. Semprún set his personal best (2:12.58) in the classic distance on February 6, 2000 in Caracas.

Achievements
All results regarding marathon, unless stated otherwise

References

sports-reference

1973 births
Living people
Venezuelan male marathon runners
Athletes (track and field) at the 2000 Summer Olympics
Olympic athletes of Venezuela
Venezuelan male long-distance runners
20th-century Venezuelan people
21st-century Venezuelan people